Scalaribalcis is a monotypic genus of very small ectoparasitic sea snails, marine gastropod mollusks or micromollusks in   the Eulimidae family. .

Species
Species within the genera Scalaribalcis include:
 Scalaribalcis angulata (Mandahl-Barth, 1949) (length: 4.5 mm; distribution: Easter Island)

References

 Mandahl-Barth, G., 1949. Mucronalia angulata n. sp. un nouveau gastéropode parasite. Journal de Conchyliologie 89: 147-149

External links 
 Warén A. (1980) Descriptions of new taxa of Eulimidae (Mollusca, Prosobranchia), with notes on some previously described genera. Zoologica Scripta 9: 283-306.
 Warén, A. (1984). A generic revision of the family Eulimidae (Gastropoda, Prosobranchia). Journal of Molluscan Studies. suppl 13: 1-96

Eulimidae